Joan E. Biren or JEB (born July 13, 1944 in Washington, DC) is an American feminist photographer and film-maker, who dramatizes the lives of LGBT people in contexts that range from healthcare and hurricane relief to Womyn’s Music and anti-racism. For portraits, she encourages sitters to act as her “muse”, rather than her “subject”. Biren was a member of The Furies Collective, a short-lived but influential lesbian commune.

Filmography
JEB's films include No Secret Anymore: The Times of Del Martin and Phyllis Lyon; Removing the Barriers, used to train healthcare providers to improve service to lesbian clients; Women Organize!; and Solidarity, Not Charity on relief efforts in New Orleans following Hurricane Katrina. Additional notable films have included Lesbian Physicians on Practice, Patients and Power and For Love and For Life: The 1987 March on Washington for Lesbian and Gay Rights. The first film is still commonly screened in medical schools around the country and the latter has been broadcast on public television.

Biren produced and wrote A Simple Matter of Justice, which documented the 1993 March on Washington for Lesbian, Gay, and Bi Equal Rights and Liberation.  The one-hour film received wide acclaim and was voted "Best Video" at the Washington, DC Reel Affirmations Film Festival.  To produce this piece, Joan set up a live six-camera switch feed that simultaneously broadcast footage on jumbo screens located on the National Mall and around the world.

Early career: The Furies and photography
Joan attended Mount Holyoke College in South Hadley, Massachusetts, where she received her B.A. in political science in 1966.  She later received a M.A. in Communication at American University in Washington, D.C.  After three years of pursuing doctoral studies at Oxford University, Biren returned home to America.  While working at a camera store and small town newspaper, Biren began to teach herself photography skills that laid the foundation for her future career.

In her early 20s, Biren and others, including Rita Mae Brown and Charlotte Bunch, formed the Furies Collective, a radical experiment in lesbian feminist separatist organizing. Though the collective lasted only about 18 months, it had a profound influence on lesbian thought through its newspaper, The Furies, and other publications.

It was in the collective that JEB began developing her skills in photography. As she has stated, "I needed to see images of lesbians." In the 1970s, Biren toured the United States, photographing lesbians at women’s events ranging from the Michigan Womyn’s Music Festival, anti–Ku Klux Klan demonstrations, writing workshops, sporting events, lesbian-separatist communities, and gay and lesbian pride marches. “Wherever lesbians gathered, where I could take pictures, I would be there.”  Beginning in 1979 JEB toured the country presenting her slide show "Lesbian Images in Photography, 1850 to the Present," also known as "The Dyke Show," to women-only audiences. Her books Eye to Eye: Portraits of Lesbians (1979) and Making a Way: Lesbians Out Front (1987) brought groundbreaking visibility to lesbian lives.

JEB’s first ever book was titled Eye to Eye: Portraits of Lesbians (1979) and it was considered a revolutionary work for its era. The book showcased JEB’s collection of photographs that she took of lesbians from different backgrounds and ages in the United States living their daily lives. Photographs that were included in her book were of lesbians in their homes embracing each other, raising a family together, and showing that they were in love. Alongside the photographs, JEB included their names and writings of their personal stories of their everyday lives.

JEB’s vision for her book was to change the way society viewed lesbians and to allow lesbians to see themselves being represented in a book. The publication of her book helped with the revolution of the lesbian movement that was occurring in the 1970s and 1980s allowing her to travel to bookstores that sold her work and even universities that requested JEB to give presentations about her book and to describe her writing and filming process as a lesbian feminist photographer.

In 1997, George Washington University mounted a retrospective exhibit of JEB's work, Queerly Visible: 1971–1991, which later toured the nation. 
In 2011, Leslie-Lohman Museum of Gay and Lesbian Art held a retrospective show, "Lesbians Seeing Lesbians: Building Community in Early Feminist Photography".

Her mentors included Audre Lorde and Barbara Deming. She said, "I watched them, and I read what they wrote, and I translated it into visuals that I needed to share as widely as possible."  In her photography, Joan tried to break away from the traditional power structures associated with photography. She preferred to use the term "muse" rather than "subject." She would also try to interact with her "muses" on equal terns. If she was photographing a nude woman, she would ask if the women wanted her to be nude as well.

In an effort to ensure that affirming images and positive self-expression occurred outside of what she considered traditional patriarchal venues, Biren included her work in off our backs, The Washington Blade, Gay Community News, and on many LP album and book covers.

Career
For many years, JEB traveled the country presenting her multi-projector slideshows and running photography workshops. In the early 1990s, she moved from slideshows to film making. JEB's award-winning films have been seen on the Sundance Channel and public broadcasting stations. She is the president of Moonforce Media, a non-profit company, which produces and distributes films and videos that challenge people to work for social justice and awards The Tee A. Corinne Prize, an annual grant to lesbian media makers.

JEB's papers and visual materials are permanently archived at The Sophia Smith Collection, the premiere women's history collection, at Smith College. Many of her photographs are located at the Library of Congress in Washington, D.C. In addition, The George Washington University houses a collection of photographs used in Queerly Visible: 1971–1991.

From Joan Biren's oral history in the Rainbow History Project collection:

In 1995, Biren became an associate of the Women's Institute for Freedom of the Press (WIFP). WIFP is an American nonprofit publishing organization. The organization works to increase communication between women and connect the public with forms of women-based media.

Bibliography of works by Joan E. Biren

References

Further reading

Archival resources
Joan E. Biren papers at the Sophia Smith Collection, Smith College
Guide to the Joan E. Biren Photograph Collection, 1971–1991, Special Collections Research Center, Estelle and Melvin Gelman Library, The George Washington University 
Guide to the Tacie Dejanikus Papers, 1967–1992, Special Collections Research Center, Estelle and Melvin Gelman Library, The George Washington University

External links

Official site
Queerly Visible: The Work of J.E.B., The George Washington University
Guide to the Joan E. Biren Photograph Collection, 1971–1991, Special Collections Research Center, Estelle and Melvin Gelman Library, The George Washington University 
Joan E. Biren. "Look To the Women for Courage: Stories From the Seneca Encampment for Peace and Justice" (1984), Sophia Smith Collection, Smith College
"The Power of Women's Voices", selections from Voices of Feminism Oral History Project, Sophia Smith Collection, Smith College

Living people
1944 births
American photographers
American women photographers
American documentary film directors
Feminist artists
Lesbian feminists
American LGBT rights activists
American LGBT photographers
American women documentary filmmakers
21st-century American women
Lesbian photographers
American lesbian artists